Pecluma is a genus of ferns in the family Polypodiaceae, subfamily Polypodioideae, according to the Pteridophyte Phylogeny Group classification of 2016 (PPG I). They are called rockcap ferns.

Species 
, Checklist of Ferns and Lycophytes of the World accepted the following species:

Pecluma absidata (A.M.Evans) M.G.Price
Pecluma alfredii (Rosenst.) M.G.Price
Pecluma atra (A.M.Evans) M.G.Price
Pecluma barituensis O.G.Martínez & de la Sota
Pecluma bermudiana (A.M.Evans) M.G.Price
Pecluma bourgeauana (E.Fourn.) L.A.Triana
Pecluma camptophyllaria (Fée) M.G.Price
Pecluma chiapensis (A.M.Evans & A.R.Sm.) M.G.Price
Pecluma chnoophora (Kunze) Salino & F.C.Assis
Pecluma choquetangensis (Rosenst.) M.G.Price
Pecluma consimilis (Eaton ex Mett.) M.G.Price
Pecluma curvans (Mett.) M.G.Price
Pecluma dispersa (A.M.Evans) M.G.Price
Pecluma divaricata (E.Fourn.) Mickel & Beitel
Pecluma dulcis (Poir.) F.C.Assis & Salino
Pecluma eurybasis (C.Chr.) M.G.Price
Pecluma ferruginea (M.Martens & Galeotti) M.G.Price
Pecluma filicula (Kaulf.) M.G.Price
Pecluma funicula (Fée) M.G.Price
Pecluma hartwegiana (Hook.) F.C.Assis & Salino
Pecluma hoehnei (A.Samp.) Salino
Pecluma hygrometrica (Splitg.) M.G.Price
Pecluma imbeana (Brade) Salino
Pecluma insularis (Brade) Salino
Pecluma liebmannii (C.Chr.) A.R.Sm. & Carv.-Hern.
Pecluma longepinnulata (E.Fourn.) F.C.Assis & Salino
Pecluma macedoi (Brade) M.Kessler & A.R.Sm.
Pecluma oranense (de la Sota) de la Sota
Pecluma paradiseae (Langsd. & Fisch.) M.G.Price
Pecluma pastazensis (Hieron.) R.C.Moran
Pecluma pectinata (L.) M.G.Price
Pecluma pectinatiformis (Lindm.) M.G.Price
Pecluma perpinnata M.Kessler & A.R.Sm.
Pecluma pilosa (A.M.Evans) M.Kessler & A.R.Sm.
Pecluma plumula (Humb. & Bonpl. ex Willd.) M.G.Price
Pecluma ptilota (Kunze) M.G.Price
Pecluma recurvata (Kaulf.) M.G.Price
Pecluma rhachipterygia (Liebm.) F.C.Assis & Salino
Pecluma robusta (Fée) M.Kessler & A.R.Sm.
Pecluma sanctae-mariae L.A.Triana
Pecluma schkuhrii (Raddi) Pic. Serm.
Pecluma sicca (Lindm.) M.G.Price
Pecluma singeri (de la Sota) M.G.Price
Pecluma sursumcurrens (Copel.) M.G.Price
Pecluma truncorum (Lindm.) M.G.Price
Pecluma venturii (de la Sota) M.G.Price

References

Polypodiaceae
Fern genera
Taxonomy articles created by Polbot